Matara may refer to:

Places

Peru
 Matara District, Cajamarca, Cajamarca Province, Peru
 , Cangallo Province, Peru

Sri Lanka
 Matara, Sri Lanka, a city on the coast of Southern Province
 Matara District, Southern Province, Sri Lanka
 Matara fort, built in 1560 by the Portuguese on a promontory which separates the Niwala Ganga lagoon from the ocean
 Matara railway station, Sri Lanka

Other places
 Matara, Eritrea, an archaeological site near Senafe

Other uses
 Matara (Martian crater)
 Matara Bodhiya, a sacred fig tree in Matara, Sri Lanka
 Matara SC, a Sri Lankan football club
 Matara Sports Club, a first-class cricket team in Sri Lanka

See also
 Matra (disambiguation)
 Matar (disambiguation)